Who Wants To Marry My Dad was an NBC-produced reality show that aired in the summer of 2003 and 2004. The point of the show was to have the children pick out a new bride for their father to propose to and marry. The show was a modest hit in ratings and returned for season two in 2004. The show was cancelled soon after ratings decreased compared to season one.

Heidi Mueller, one of the daughters in season one, joined Passions after Who Wants to Marry My Dad?'s second season ended.

References

External links
Official Website

NBC original programming
2000s American reality television series
2003 American television series debuts
2004 American television series endings